Club Life may refer to:
Tiësto's Club Life, a weekly radio show by DJ Tiësto
Club Life (1987 film), starring Tony Curtis
Club Life (2015 film), starring Danny A. Abeckaser